The UK Co-ordinating Body is an executive unit of the Government of the United Kingdom that assists other national and regional government bodies in implementing the European Union's Common Agricultural Policy.

External links 
 https://www.gov.uk/government/organisations/uk-co-ordinating-body

European Union and agriculture
Public bodies and task forces of the United Kingdom government